The 2006 Cheltenham Council election took place on 4 May 2006 to elect members of Cheltenham Borough Council in Gloucestershire, England. Half of the council was up for election and the council stayed under no overall control.

After the election, the composition of the council was:
Liberal Democrat 17
Conservative 17
People Against Bureaucracy 5
Labour 1

Election result
Results of the election saw the Conservatives and Liberal Democrats end with 17 seats each. The Labour Party lost one of their two seats leaving the People Against Bureaucracy Action Group holding the balance of power. Overall turnout in the election was 36.32%.

After the election Conservative Duncan Smith took over as leader of the council, replacing Liberal Democrat Andrew McKinlay, after the Conservatives received the backing of the People Against Bureaucracy Action Group.

Ward results

Rowena Hay was a sitting councillor for Warden Hill.

References

2006 English local elections
2006
2000s in Gloucestershire